This article shows the rosters of all participating teams at the women's handball tournament at the 2020 Summer Olympics in Tokyo.

Each roster consists of 15 players, where 14 can be chosen for each match. The players can be changed without restrictions.

Age, clubs, caps and goals as of the start of the tournament, 25 July 2021.

Group A

Angola
The squad was announced on 9 July 2021.

Head coach: Filipe Cruz

Japan
The squad was announced on 28 June 2021. On 30 July, Kaho Sunami was replaced by Mana Horikawa.

Head coach:  Ulrik Kirkely

Montenegro
The squad was announced on 9 July 2021.

Head coach: Bojana Popović

Netherlands
The squad was announced on 30 June 2021.

Head coach:  Emmanuel Mayonnade

Norway
The squad was announced on 3 July 2021.

Head coach:  Thorir Hergeirsson

South Korea
The squad was announced on 14 June 2021.

Head coach: Kang Jae-won

Group B

Brazil
The squad was announced on 12 July 2021.

Head coach:  Jorge Dueñas

France
The squad was announced on 5 July 2021. On 28 July, Alexandra Lacrabère was replaced by Océane Sercien-Ugolin.

Head coach: Olivier Krumbholz

Hungary
The squad was announced on 2 July 2021. On 30 July, Zita Szucsánszki was replaced by Fanny Helembai, and Kinga Janurik was replaced by  Melinda Szikora.

Head Coach: Gábor Elek

ROC
The squad was announced on 5 July 2021.

Head coach: Alexey Alekseev

Spain
The squad was announced on 12 July 2021.

Head coach: Carlos Viver

Sweden
The squad was announced on 18 June 2021. Nina Dano was added after the squad limit was increased from 14 to 15 players. On 21 July, four days before the tournament started, Isabelle Andersson was replaced by Johanna Westberg, because of a knee injury during preparations.

Head coach: Tomas Axnér

See also
Handball at the 2020 Summer Olympics – Men's team rosters

References

Women's team rosters
2020
Handball Women's